Coleophora roridella is a moth of the family Coleophoridae. It is found in Afghanistan.

The larvae feed on Artemisia turanica. They feed on the leaves of their host plant.

References

roridella
Moths of Asia
Moths described in 1967